Rossiya Segodnya is a Russian state-controlled media group.

Rossiya Segodnya (Russia Today) may also refer to:

 RT (TV network), a Russian television network
 Russian Federation Today, a Russian-language magazine